Panasonic Lumix DMC-FZ100 is a digital camera by Panasonic Lumix released in July 2010. The highest-resolution pictures it records is 14.1 megapixels, through its 25 mm Leica DC VARIO-ELMARIT.

Property
Ultra wide-angle with 24× optical zoom
Full HD movie recording
Venus Engine FHD

References

External links

DMC-FZ100K on shop.panasonic.com

Bridge digital cameras
FZ100
Superzoom cameras